You Can't Run Away from It is a 1956 musical comedy directed and produced by Dick Powell and starring June Allyson and Jack Lemmon. The film is a remake of the 1934 Academy Award-winning film It Happened One Night. The supporting cast features Charles Bickford, Jim Backus, Stubby Kaye, Jack Albertson and Howard McNear. It Happened One Night had also been remade as a musical comedy in 1945 as Eve Knew Her Apples.

Plot
Because she married an international playboy, Ellie Andrews (June Allyson) is kidnapped by her own father, Texas cattleman A. A. Andrews (Charles Bickford). She escapes, managing to evade his nationwide search for her with the help of Peter Warne (Jack Lemmon), a jobless reporter, who sees himself getting the biggest story of the year - until he and Ellie fall in love. When Ellie suspects Peter has sold her out, she returns home. Realizing his daughter really loves the newspaperman, Andrews tries to persuade Ellie to run away again, this time from her own wedding ceremony. Who will Ellie choose, her husband or the man who has stolen her heart?

Cast
 June Allyson as Ellie Andrews
 Jack Lemmon as Peter Warne
 Charles Bickford as A.A. Andrews
 Paul Gilbert as George Shapely
 Jim Backus as Danker
 Stubby Kaye as Fred Toten
 Allyn Joslyn as Joe Gordon, Editor
 Henny Youngman as First Driver
 Jacques Scott as Jacques 'Jack' Ballarino
 Walter Baldwin as 1st Proprietor
 The Four Aces as Vocal Quartette

Soundtrack

Decca Records issued selections from the soundtrack on one side of an Lp Record, with music from other film scores on the reverse.

Selections include:
 "You Can't Run Away from It"  Performed by The Four Aces
 "Howdy Friends and Neighbours"  Performed by Stubby Kaye, June Allyson, and Jack Lemmon
 "Thumbin' a Ride"  Performed by June Allyson and Jack Lemmon
 "Temporarily"  Performed by June Allyson and Jack Lemmon
 "Scarecrow Ballet"  Performed by Morris Stoloff conducting the Columbia Studio Orchestra

These selections were reissued on CD by Decca Broadway, paired with the Broadway cast album of Texas Li'l Darlin'.

See also
 List of American films of 1956

References

External links
 
 
 
 

1956 films
1956 musical comedy films
1956 romantic comedy films
American musical comedy films
American romantic comedy films
American romantic musical films
American screwball comedy films
Columbia Pictures films
CinemaScope films
1950s English-language films
Remakes of American films
Films about journalists
Films directed by Dick Powell
1950s American films